The Mylar Jaatre' is the biggest fair in Karnataka and one of the biggest in South India. More than 10 lakh devotees from all parts of the State and some neighbouring States congregate at Mylara, a pilgrim centre in Hadagali taluk, Bellary district, for the annual “Karnikotsava” (prophecy). The fair is celebrated every year at the local temple dedicated to Shiva in his form as Mailareshwara, the patron deity of the Kuruba Gowda community. Mylara is situated in the south-western corner of Hadagali taluk of the district, and is situated two km from Tungabhadra river and about 40 km from Hadagali town. It is believed that every year at Bharat hunnime (the full moon in February), Elukoti with his wife Gangamalavva riding on a white horse will visit this place. People still experience thunder and lightning upon arrival of the God. This God believed to be a very fond of his bhaktas and will be pleased with Naivedya made of banana, sugar, ghee and milk mixed together.

There is an interesting story about why did got get Elukoti name. It is believed that avtara of lord shiva gave elu Koti (7 crore) rupees to lord Venkateshwara for his marriage, but never returned, then lord shiva became furious and people are cooling him by calling Elukoti.

References

Festivals in Karnataka
Tourist attractions in Ballari district